Joshua Casteel (27 December 1979 – 25 August 2012) was a United States Army soldier, conscientious objector, playwright, and divinity student. He volunteered for the army in 2002 and conducted interrogations in Abu Ghraib prison.

In 2005 he received an honorable discharge as a conscientious objector. He was active in the anti-war movement before dying of lung cancer in 2012. His cancer can be attributed to the inhalation of many toxic fumes from the burn pits he guarded and slept by while he served in the Iraqi war.

Early life
Casteel was born in Sioux Falls, South Dakota and raised in Cedar Rapids, Iowa in a Christian evangelical family. When he was seven years old Casteel attended Iowa caucus events and by high school he was president of a local chapter of the Young Republicans. Casteel was active in the local community theatre, Theatre Cedar Rapids, where he had lead roles in Joseph and the Technicolor Dreamcoat, and The Who's Tommy

Army career
When Casteel was seventeen years old, he enlisted as an Army reservist in the delayed entry program to improve his chances of being admitted to the US Military Academy at West Point. Casteel did win an appointment to West Point and began his studies there in June 1998 but dropped out in his first term.

He enlisted in the active duty Army in May 2002, the same month he graduated from the University of Iowa, and began his training as an interrogator at Fort Huachuca in September of that year. Following completion of the basic interrogator course he studied Arabic at the Defense Language Institute in Monterey, California.

His unit arrived in Iraq in 2004, six weeks after revelation of abuses by US personnel at the Abu Ghraib prison. Casteel served with the Army's 202nd Military Intelligence Battalion as an interrogator at the prison and claimed to have conducted over 130 prisoner interrogations there. He was promoted to sergeant in August 2004.

In October 2004, Casteel interrogated "a self-professed jihadist" from Saudi Arabia.  Casteel later described his encounter "with the prisoner as almost mystical, an apotheosis."  When Casteel asked the Saudi prisoner "why he'd come to Iraq to kill" the jihadist turned the tables and asked Casteel, "Why did you come to Iraq to kill?" He further claimed that Casteel failed to "follow Christ to pray for those who persecute you, or pray for your enemies" and "to turn the other cheek, to love those who hate you." The experience provoked a spiritual crisis in Casteel leading him to apply for conscientious objector status.

After Casteel applied for conscientious objector status, he was assigned to guarding a burn pit. He left Iraq and returned to Iowa in January 2005. Six months after applying, the Army approved his application as a conscientious objector and granted him an honorable discharge in May 2005.

Post-army career
Casteel graduated from the University of Iowa in 2008 with a dual master of fine arts degree in playwriting and non-fiction writing. He was enrolled at the University of Chicago's Divinity School in 2010. As a public speaker on religious and political matters, Casteel addressed audiences in the US, Ireland, Sweden, Italy and the UK.

He was an active member of Iraq Veterans Against the War. Casteel was featured in the documentary films Iraq for Sale: The War Profiteers and Soldiers of Conscience.

In 2019, a Smithsonian article entitled "The Priest of Abu Ghraib", profiled Casteel and discussed his theological struggles while interrogating Muslim prisoners in Iraq. The author, Jennifer Percy, met Casteel in 2009 when they were classmates in the Iowa Writers' Workshop.

Stage performances & writings

On June 19, 2006, Casteel shared the bill with Vaclav Havel, Harold Pinter, Tom Stoppard, and Jeremy Irons at the Royal Court Theatre for his solo performance of his play, The Interrogation Room. In May 2007, the play was again performed in New York City on the Atlantic Theater's Stage Two as part of the National MFA Playwright's Festival. Casteel's Returns: A Play in One Act was performed at the University of Iowa, Columbia College Chicago, De Balie (Amsterdam), and at Princeton University. The Alaska Quarterly Review published Returns in 2008."

Also in 2008, excerpts of Casteel's emails from Iraq were published in Harper's Magazine and in book form as Letters from Abu Ghraib by Essay Press with a foreword by Christopher Merrill. In the fall of 2008, the Virginia Quarterly Review published "Combat Multipliers", a reflection by Casteel on a mural adorning the Army chapel at Abu Ghraib and an attack by insurgents on the compound while he was assigned there. A second edition of Letters from Abu Ghraib was published in 2017 by Cascade Books with a new foreword by Stanley Hauerwas.

Death
Casteel died of lung cancer in New York City in New York-Presbyterian Hospital on August 25, 2012. An oncologist told Casteel's mother that "Joshua died of lung cancer without having any of the conventional risk factors such as smoking, asbestos exposure or radiation ... I am quite sure we did not have anyone younger with lung cancer those five years I worked at the VA." Casteel's family believes his cancer was the result of exposure to toxins released by a burn pit he slept near for six months in Iraq. He was a University of Chicago Divinity School graduate student at the time of his death.

References

External links

 "Army C.O. Application by Joshua Casteel" on the Catholic Peace Fellowship web site. Accessed 23 August 2019.
 "Joshua Casteel: 'To Love One's Enemies' ", a video clip from Soldiers of Conscience. Accessed 21 June 2013.
 "Call of Duty", an essay by Casteel on military-themed first-person shooter video games. Accessed 14 August 2013.
 joshuacasteel.com (archived), a site about Joshua maintained by his family. Accessed 23 August 2019.
 "Authors – Joshua Casteel (archived)," a short biography on the Essay Press web site. Accessed 18 December 2014.

1979 births
2012 deaths
21st-century American dramatists and playwrights
21st-century American non-fiction writers
American anti-war activists
United States Army personnel of the Iraq War
American Christian writers
American conscientious objectors
American military writers
Converts to Roman Catholicism from Evangelicalism
Iowa Writers' Workshop alumni
United States Army soldiers
United States military personnel at the Abu Ghraib prison
Writers from Cedar Rapids, Iowa
Writers from Sioux Falls, South Dakota
Military personnel from Iowa
Military personnel from South Dakota
Deaths from lung cancer in New York (state)